William Lamb Picknell (October 23, 1853 – August 8, 1897) was an American painter of landscapes, coastal views, and figure genres, known for his rapid painting style. He was born in Hinesburg, Vermont and died in Marblehead, Massachusetts.

Life and career
Born in Hinesburg, Vermont, William was the son of Ellen Maria Upham and the Reverend William Lamb Picknell, a Baptist minister, both of New England families.  In July, 1868, the summer following his father's death, the Picknell family moved to Chelsea, Massachusetts.

He began his career by working in a Boston frame shop. In 1872, he travelled to Europe where he trained with Jean-Léon Gérôme in Rome (1874–75) and also received some informal training from Robert Wylie in Brittany.

Throughout the 1880s, he primarily lived Waltham, Massachusetts, but frequently travelled abroad; spending two winters in England and also visiting other parts of the US, including Florida and California.  He was living at Moret-sur-Loing, on the edge of the Forest of Fontainebleau, for most of the 1890s, but often spent the winters in the south of France. He returned to Massachusetts in 1897. He died of heart failure in Marblehead on August 8, 1897.

Notable works

 The Road to Concarneau 1880, Corcoran Gallery
 Lobster Fisherman 1882
 Lande de Kerran, Finistere 1877
 Morning on the Loing at Moret c. 1895, Museum of Fine Arts, Boston
 Banks of the Loing c. 1895

Honors
 Honorable Mention, Paris Salon, 1880 (The Road to Concarneau)
 Member, Society of American Artists
 Associate, National Academy of Design
 Member, Society of British Artists

See also
 List of Orientalist artists
 Orientalism

References

 William Lamb Picknell from the Dictionary of American Artists
 William Lamb Picknell on the Amico Library

Further reading

External links
Artwork by William Lamb Picknell

1853 births
1897 deaths
19th-century American painters
19th-century American male artists
American alumni of the École des Beaux-Arts
American male painters
National Academy of Design associates
Orientalist painters
People from Marblehead, Massachusetts
People from Hinesburg, Vermont
Pont-Aven painters
Vermont culture